The 30th Seoul Music Awards, organized by Sports Seoul and broadcast through KBS N and Niconico, on January 31, 2021. The ceremony was held with no on-site audience due to the COVID-19 pandemic.

Background
On January 24, 2021, Shin Dong-yup, Kim Hee-chul and Choi Soo-young was announced as the host of the ceremony.

Criteria
All songs and albums that are eligible to be nominated must be released from January to December 2020.

Winners and nominees

Winners are listed first and emphasized in bold.

The list of nominees for:
 Fan PD Artist Award were announced on December 1, 2020, through the Idol Champ application.
 WhosFandom Award were announced on December 8, 2020, through the Whofans application.
 remaining categories were announced on December 9, 2020, through the official website.
The online voting for:
 Fan PD Artist Award opened on the Idol Champ application on December 1, 2020, and closed on December 31, 2020.
 WhosFandom Award opened on the WhosFan application on December 15, 2020, and closed on December 18, 2020.
 remaining categories opened on the official website on December 11, 2020, and closed on January 24, 2021.

Presenters and performers

Presenters

Performers

References

External links
  (in English & Korean)

2021 in South Korean music
Seoul